Ivaylo Moskovski (born 19 July 1972 in Pleven) is a Bulgarian politician and former Minister of Transport, Information Technology and Communications in Bulgaria.

Ivaylo Moskovski was born on 19 July 1972 in Pleven, Bulgaria. He graduated Public Finances in UNWE and Financial Management in D.A.Tsenov Academy of Economics, Svishtov.  

Ivaylo Moskovski was Deputy Minister of Transports, Information Technology and Communications and after Aleksadar Tsvetkov resigned was appointed Minister of Transport, Information Technology and Communications.

Moskovski's 4-year-old son, Kristian, was killed in a skidoo accident in the Bulgarian winter sports resort of Borovets in February 2018. 

Moskovski offered his resignation as Transport Minister on 30 October 2018 following controversies relating to a deadly bus crash near Svoge, Bulgaria in which 20 people died.

On 17 December 2018 Moskovski was appointed Vice President Operations by the Black Sea Trade and Development Bank based in Thessaloniki.

References

1972 births
Living people
People from Pleven
University of National and World Economy alumni
Communication ministers of Bulgaria
Transport ministers of Bulgaria
Government ministers of Bulgaria
GERB politicians